James Niels Peterson  (August 18, 1908 – April 8, 1975) was an American Major League Baseball pitcher from 1931 to 1937. He attended the University of Pennsylvania.

On September 30, 1933, Peterson was sent to the Louisville Colonels as part of the compensation for Johnny Marcum, whom the Athletics had acquired on August 20.

Born in Philadelphia, Peterson died in Palm Beach, Florida, aged 66.

References

External links

1908 births
1975 deaths
Baseball players from Pennsylvania
Major League Baseball pitchers
Brooklyn Dodgers players
Philadelphia Athletics players
Portland Beavers players
Louisville Colonels (minor league) players